Angelito: Ang Bagong Yugto is a 2012 Philippine daytime television drama aired on ABS-CBN and worldwide on The Filipino Channel. It is the sequel of Angelito: Batang Ama. JM De Guzman, Charee Pineda, Kaye Abad, Devon Seron and Sam Concepcion reprise their roles from the prequel. The show introduces a new character played by John Prats, which replaced Matt Evans' character, Rolan, after he is imprisoned at the end of the prequel. Bagong Yugto replacing Mundo Man ay Magunaw and was replaced by MMK Klasiks from July 16, 2012 to December 14, 2012.

Plot
Angelito and Rosalie finally get married and start raising their son together. However, Jenny, who started a new life in Singapore at the end of the previous season, discovers she is pregnant with Angelito's child. Pledging not to reappear in Angelito's life again, she turns to her childhood friend Raffy for comfort, but circumstances prompt her to return to the Philippines and cross paths with the Santos family once more.

Cast and characters

Main cast
 JM de Guzman as Angelito Santos-Dimaano
 Charee Pineda as Rosalie Dimaano-Santos
 John Prats as Rafael "Raffy" Montanez
 Kaye Abad as Jenny Abella-Montanez

Supporting cast
 Elizabeth Oropesa as Josephina "Pinang" Santos
 Al Tantay as Delfin Dimaano
 Snooky Serna as Adele Dimaano
 Sam Concepcion as Migoy Abella
 Devon Seron as Teresa "Tere" Santos
 Sue Ramirez as Rona Dimaano
 Kiko Estrada as Leo Samaniego
 Jobelle Salvador as Lina Abella
 Joshen Bernardo as Angelito "Jun-Jun" D. Santos Jr.
 Bea Basa as Malena Mhaica Emily "Mai-Mai" Ambrosio
 Felix Roco as Spongky
 Jason Francisco as Mervin
 Beauty Gonzalez as Seksi
 Josef Elizalde as Charlotte
 Eliza Pineda as Rowena Dimaano
 Mariel Pamintuan as Rachel Dimaano
 Eric Fructuoso as Larry Samaniego

Guest cast
 Jessica Connelly as Kaila Montañez
 Anika Gonzales as Ella Montañez
 Aldred Gatchalian as Rodel Dimaano
 Valerie Concepcion as Emily
 Jao Mapa as Ramon Flores
 Irma Adlawan as Sally
 Karen Reyes as Sofia
 Sitti Navarro as Susan Samaniego
 Eda Nolan as Sheila Muñoz
 Seiichi Ushimi as Lester
 Deydey Amansec as Carlo
 Hazel Chua as Amor
 Kim De Guzman as Edwina Velasco
 Farrah Florer as Rosalie's doctor
 Karen Dematera as Jamie
 Vangie Martelle as Kim
 Roy Requejo as Deng
 Jerico Redrico
 Rocky Salumbides

See also
List of programs broadcast by ABS-CBN
List of dramas of ABS-CBN
Angelito: Batang Ama

References

External links
 

ABS-CBN drama series
2012 Philippine television series debuts
2012 Philippine television series endings
Sequel television series
Filipino-language television shows
Television shows filmed in the Philippines
Television shows filmed in Singapore